Nevada City  is a 1941 American Western film directed by Joseph Kane starring Roy Rogers and George "Gabby" Hayes.

Plot
The local stagecoach line that Jeff Connors and Gabby work for are not only facing competition from the railroad, but Black Bart's band of outlaws. The head of the stage line feels the railroad is behind Black Bart's attack but Jeff is not so sure.

Cast 
Roy Rogers as Jeff Connors
George "Gabby" Hayes as "Gabby" Chapman
Sally Payne as Jo Morrison
George Cleveland as Hank Liddell
Billy Lee as Chick Morrison
Joseph Crehan as Mark Benton
 Fred Kohler Jr. as Jim Trevor / Black Bart
Pierre Watkin as Amos Norton
Jack Ingram as Sheriff Pat Daley

External links 

1941 films
1941 Western (genre) films
American black-and-white films
Republic Pictures films
Films directed by Joseph Kane
American Western (genre) films
1940s English-language films
1940s American films